Lafond Bay is a bay,  wide, which lies south of the Cockerell Peninsula of the Trinity Peninsula in Antarctica. Its head is fed by Sestrimo Glacier.

The bay was surveyed by the Falkland Islands Dependencies Survey (1960–61), and was named by the UK Antarctic Place-Names Committee after Lieutenant Pierre Lafond, a French naval officer on the Astrolabe during her Antarctic voyage (1837–40).

References

Bays of Trinity Peninsula